The East Siberian Lowland, also known as Yana-Kolyma Lowland, is a vast plain in Northeastern Siberia, Russia. The territory of the lowland is one of the Great Russian Regions. Administratively it is part of the Sakha Republic (Yakutia).

Owing to the harshness of the climate the East Siberian Lowland is largely unpopulated. Inhabited centers are small and widely scattered. Chokurdakh, Olenegorsk, Nizhneyansk, Russkoye Ustye, Zyryanka, Srednekolymsk, Argakhtakh and Andryushkino are among the few towns in the area.

Geography
The East Siberian Lowland is an extensive region located in the far north-east of Siberia. Except for a small section at the southern end the lowland region lies almost wholly north of the Polar Circle. The lowland includes the Yana-Indigirka, Kolyma and Aby lowlands, vast alluvial plains, swampy and dotted with thousands of lakes. These smaller lowland units are limited by residual ridges which break the generally flat relief, including the Kyundyulyun, Polousny Range, Ulakhan-Sis, Kondakov Plateau and Suor Uyata, as well as by isolated hills rising from the tundra, such as the Kisilyakh-Tas by the Alazeya. Most of the kigilyakhs of Yakutia are found in these elevated areas of the East Siberian Lowland.

To the north the East Siberian Lowland is bound by shallow marginal seas of the Arctic Ocean, the Laptev Sea and the East Siberian Sea. It includes the large New Siberian Islands and the smaller Medvezhy Islands, which form a continuum with the Eastern Siberian continental lowland region. To the west, south and southwest the lowland is limited by the East Siberian Mountains, including the Verkhoyansk Range, the Chersky Range and their foothills, as well as by the Alazeya Plateau, and to the east by the western end of the ranges of the Anadyr and the Yukaghir Highlands.

The lowlands are crossed by slowly meandering rivers flowing mostly northwards. The main ones are the Yana, Indigirka and Kolyma and their tributaries, as well as the smaller Omoloy, Alazeya, Sundrun and Khroma rivers. Except for the very large ones, most of the rivers of the lowland freeze to the bottom in the winter. 

Continuous permafrost is prevalent in the East Siberian Lowlands, and permafrost-related formations such as alas thermokarst depressions and baydzharakh mounds are common throughout the region.

Geology
Geologically the lowland is mainly composed of sediments of marine origin. these date back to the time when the area was occupied by the Verkhoyansk Sea, an ancient sea which took up most of the basin of the present-day Yana River and the upper reaches of the Indigirka in the Permian period. The Verkhoyansk Sea was located at the eastern edge of the Siberian Craton. As centuries went by, most of the area became gradually filled with the alluvial deposits of modern rivers.

Climate, flora and fauna
The climate prevailing in the lowland is subarctic and severe, characterized by long, very cold winters. In July the average temperature reaches  by the seashore, but stays a chilly  in the inland zone.
Most of the lowland is covered by tundra. Only at the southern end in the upper Kolyma River basin there is a region where larch taiga can grow.

There are wild reindeer herds in the Sundrun River that have a yearly migration pattern. The total reindeer population of the East Siberian Lowland, however, is small when compared with other areas, such as the Canadian Arctic. Rivers and lakes are abundant in fish, such as Arctic char (golets), Siberian vendace, chir, East Siberian grayling, muksun, nelma and omul. In the summer the wetlands are home to large populations of migratory birds, including the Siberian crane, Brent goose, Bewick's swan and the spectacled eider.

See also

List of ecoregions in Russia
Northeast Siberian coastal tundra
Yedoma

References

External links

Wetlands in Russia - Vol.4